Stephen Leonard Senteney III (August 7, 1955 – June 18, 1989) was a Major League Baseball pitcher who played briefly in  with the Toronto Blue Jays. He batted and threw right-handed and had a 0–0 record, with a 4.91 ERA, in 11 games, in his one-year career. Following his single season with Toronto, the Blue Jays traded him to the New York Mets for Jorge Orta.

Senteney was born in Indianapolis, Indiana.  He served in the United States Marine Corps towards the end of the Vietnam War.

Senteney was killed in an automobile accident in Colusa, California at age 33, and is interred in Sylvan Cemetery in Citrus Heights, California.

References

External links
, or Retrosheet

1955 births
1989 deaths
Algodoneros de Unión Laguna players
American expatriate baseball players in Canada
American expatriate baseball players in Mexico
Baseball players from Indianapolis
Calgary Cannons players
Cardenales de Lara players
Ganaderos de Tabasco players
Hawaii Islanders players
Kinston Eagles players
Knoxville Blue Jays players
Major League Baseball pitchers
Medicine Hat Blue Jays players
Mexican League baseball pitchers
Nashua Pirates players
Navegantes del Magallanes players
American expatriate baseball players in Venezuela
Road incident deaths in California
Saint Mary's Gaels baseball players
Syracuse Chiefs players
Tidewater Tides players
Toronto Blue Jays players
United States Marine Corps personnel of the Vietnam War